The following is a list of census-designated places in Michigan.  According to the United States Census Bureau, the U.S. state of Michigan listed 212 census-designated places (CDPs) used for statistical purposes at the 2020 census.

In the state of Michigan, CDPs are also categorized as unincorporated communities and do not hold any legal autonomy as an incorporated municipality.  Their boundaries and population counts are for statistical purposes only, and CDPs fall under the jurisdiction of the township(s) in which they are located.  CDPs can span multiple townships and counties and be part of a civil township or charter township but cannot contain boundaries within incorporated municipalities, such as villages or cities.  Boundaries for a CDP may change between a census.

There are no minimum population requirements for an area to be designated as a CDP. The smallest CDP by population is Pilgrim with a population of 44.

Former census-designated places
Census-designated places were first introduced by the U.S. Census Bureau for the 1980 census.  In some cases, a census-designated place may cease to exist and not be reported on an upcoming census.  This may be a result of deletion, reclassification, or if the CDP becomes absorbed into an incorporated municipality.  For the 2010 census, the U.S. Census Bureau removed 14 CDPs from Michigan.  Of those, 11 were classified as minor civil divisions (MCD) that were already conterminous with an organized township and did not require dual designations.  For the 2010 census, the U.S. Census Bureau removed the CDP designation for any MCD that was coextensive with a designated CDP.  In Michigan, these remaining townships included Bloomfield, Canton, Carrollton, Clinton, Grosse Ile, Harrison, Plymouth, Redford, Shelby, Waterford, and West Bloomfield.  These townships are no longer classified as CDPs, and there are no municipalities in the state that carry the CDP designation.

The K.I. Sawyer CDP, which was listed as the "military K. I. Sawyer AFB CDP" in 2000, was also deleted, but a small portion of the deleted CDP was reorganized and renamed as the "civilian K. I. Sawyer CDP"  for the 2010 census.  Greater Galesburg, Saginaw Township North, and Saginaw Township South are the only three to have been completely dissolved and not reported in any form from the 2000 census to the 2010 census.  

For the 2020 census, only one CDP was not reported from the previous census.  The Barnes Lake–Millers Lake CDP was not listed in the 2020 census, as it was split into two distinct CDPs instead: Barnes Lake and Millers Lake.

Current list
The following table lists all the census-designated places (CDPs) in Michigan according to data from the 2020 census.  All information comes from 2020 census data, as well as listing population changes from the 2010 census.  In the 2020 census, the state contained 212 CDPs, which is 53 more than reported in the 2010 census.  Newly designated CDPs will be listed as having a population of zero at the 2010 census since it did not exist at the time.  In the cases where a CDP spans multiple townships or counties, the township and county listed first contains the largest land area for the CDP.

Three CDPs also serve as a county seat: Atlanta (Montmorency County), Eagle River (Keweenaw County), and Mio (Oscoda County).  Being designated as a county seat, however, does not give any legal authority or autonomy to the CDP and is merely the location of the county's seat of government.

See also
Administrative divisions of Michigan
List of counties in Michigan
List of municipalities in Michigan

References

External links
 Cities, villages, and CDPs area statistics
 State of Michigan census designated places

 
Census-designated places
Michigan